Agustín Hernández Navarro (29 February 1924 – 10 November 2022) was a Mexican architect and sculptor.

Biography
Hernández Navarro was born in Mexico City, the son of politician Lamberto Hernández and Amalia Navarro; he was the brother of choreographer Amalia Hernández, architect Lamberto Hernández, Delfina Hernández, and Gabriela Hernández. He studied at the National Autonomous University of Mexico, earning his degree in 1954, where he has been giving lectures for some time. The leading exponent of "emotional" architecture, Hernández fused elements from Mexico's Pre-columbian past in his contemporary architecture. He stated to normally start by designing vertical elements of a building, such as the stairs of the building or house as he felt these are of much importance. He said that his architecture unites structure, form, and function, as in organic nature.

Hernández Navarro died on 10 November 2022, at the age of 98.

Major works
 1968, Folkloric Ballet School, Mexico City
 1970, Praxis - Casa Hernández, Mexico City
 1970, Mexican Pavilion, Osaka Expo, Japan
 1974, Hospital Center IMSS, Mexico
 1976, Heroic Military College, Mexico
 1984, Meditation Center, Cuernavaca
 1991, "House in the Air", Mexico City
 1997, Calakmul Corporate Building, Santa Fe, Mexico City
 2005, State of Mexico University, Toluca, State of Mexico

Prizes & Awards 
His works have won national and international recognition such as 
 1987 Presea III Biennale of Architecture, in Sofia, Bulgaria
 1989 Presea Biennial, Buenos Aires, Argentina
 1990 1st. Gold Medal Award II Mexican Architecture Biennale
 1996 1st. First National Steel Prize AHMSA, National Award IMEI to the Intelligent Building of the Corporate Calakmul
 2003 National Arts Award
 2006 XI Triennial Gold Medal Interarch, in Sofia, Bulgaria,
 2009 International Academy of Architecture Annual Prix, ¨Arcus House ¨, Sofia, Bulgaria
 2009 World Triennial of Architecture, Special Prize Silver medal ¨Arcus House ¨,  Sofia, Bulgaria
 2010 CEMEX Lifetime achievement award, Cementos Mexicanos, Monterrey Nl.

Official Website 
http://www.wix.com/agustinhernandez/arquitecto

External links

References

1924 births
2022 deaths
Mexican architects
Mexican sculptors
Male sculptors
National Autonomous University of Mexico alumni
National Prize for Arts and Sciences (Mexico)
People from Mexico City
Architecture firms of Mexico